"Cradle of Love" is a song released in 1960 by Johnny Preston written by Jack Fautheree & Wayne Gray.

Background
The lyrics of "Cradle of Love" quote several well known nursery rhymes with variations that tie them to the song's title. The song's chorus quotes Rock-a-bye Baby, the first verse quotes Jack Be Nimble, the second verse quotes Hey Diddle Diddle, and the third verse quotes Jack and Jill.

Chart performance
In the US, the song spent 15 weeks on the Billboard Hot 100 chart, peaking at No. 7, and No. 15 on Billboards Hot R&B Sides.
Outside the US, it went to No. 2 in the United Kingdom, No. 4 on Canada's CHUM Hit Parade, No. 5 on Norway's VG-lista, No. 7 in Australia, and No. 15 in Japan.

Cover versions
Using the name "Bobby Stevens", Ray Pilgrim recorded a version of the song in 1960.

References

1960 songs
1960 singles
Johnny Preston songs
Mercury Records singles